This list of impact craters on Earth contains a selection of the 190 confirmed craters given in the Earth Impact Database as of 2017.

To keep the lists manageable, only the largest craters within a time period are included. Alphabetical lists for different continents can be found under Craters by continent below.

Confirmed impact craters listed by size and age
These features were caused by the collision of meteors (consisting of large fragments of asteroids) or comets (consisting of ice, dust particles and rocky fragments) with the Earth. For eroded or buried craters, the stated diameter typically refers to the best available estimate of the original rim diameter, and may not correspond to present surface features. Time units are either in ka (thousands) or Ma (millions) of years.

10 ka or less
The EID lists fewer than ten such craters, and the largest in the last 100,000 years (100 ka) is the  Rio Cuarto crater in Argentina. However, there is some uncertainty regarding its origins and age, with some sources giving it as < 10 ka while the EID gives a broader < 100 ka.

The Kaali impacts (c. 2000 BC) during the Nordic Bronze Age may have influenced Estonian and Finnish mythology, the Campo del Cielo (c. 2000 BC) could be in the legends of some Native American tribes, while Henbury (c. 2200 BC) has figured in Australian Aboriginal oral traditions.

For the Rio Cuarto craters, 2002 research suggests they may actually be aeolian structures.

10 ka to 1 Ma
From between 10 thousand years and one million years ago, and with a diameter of less than :

The largest in the last one million years is the  Zhamanshin crater in Kazakhstan and has been described as being capable of producing a nuclear-like winter.

1 Ma to 10 Ma

From between 1 and 10 million years ago, and with a diameter of 5 km or more. If uncertainties regarding its age are resolved, then the largest in the last 10 million years would be the  Karakul crater which is listed in EID with an age of less than 5 Ma, or the Pliocene. The large but apparently craterless Eltanin impact (2.5 Ma) into the Pacific Ocean has been suggested as contributing to the glaciations and cooling during the Pliocene.

10 Ma or more
Craters with diameter  or more are all older than 10 Ma, except possibly Karakul, whose age is uncertain.

There are more than forty craters of such size. The largest two within the last hundred million years have been linked to two extinction events: Chicxulub for the Cretaceous–Paleogene and the Popigai impact for the Eocene–Oligocene extinction event.

Craters by continent
, the Earth Impact Database (EID) contains 190 confirmed craters. (As of 2022, no update has yet been made to the database.) The table below is arranged by the continent's percentage of the Earth's land area, and where Asian and Russian craters are grouped together per EID convention. The global distribution of known impact structures apparently shows a surprising asymmetry, with the small but well-funded European continent having a large percentage of confirmed craters. It is suggested this situation is an artifact, highlighting the importance of intensifying research in less studied areas like Antarctica, South America and elsewhere.

Links in the column "Continent" will give a list of craters for that continent.

See also
 Bolides
 Earth Impact Database
 Extinction event
 Impact events
 Impact Field Studies Group
 List of possible impact structures on Earth
 Traces of Catastrophe, 1998 book from Lunar and Planetary Institute – comprehensive reference on impact crater science
 Giant-impact hypothesis

Notes

References

External links
 Impact Database (formerly Suspected Earth Impact Sites list) maintained by David Rajmon for Impact Field Studies Group, US
 Impact Meteor Crater Viewer Google Maps Page with Locations of Meteor Craters around the world

Lists of coordinates